Glory is the eighth studio album from Christian rock band Kutless, and the album released on February 11, 2014 by BEC Recordings. It is the band's final album with long-time rhythm guitarist Nick DePartee, as well as their only album with drummer Kyle Peek.. The producers on the album were Ian Eskelin and Dave Lubben. This album received generally positive reception from critics.

Critical reception

Glory garnered generally positive reception from twelve music critics. Grace S. Aspinwall of CCM Magazine rated the album three stars out of five, calling the album "accessible to the everyday worship leader in small town America as it is to the players on music row." At HM, Sarah Brehm rated the album three stars, noting that on the album "musicianship is satisfactory, it’s that most of the tracks aren’t memorable", and "the songs have a hard time distinguishing themselves from one another [...] a common problem with worship albums." Jonathan Andre of Indie Vision Music rated the album three stars, writing that the release "is certain to draw some critics and commendable words alike." At New Release Tuesday, Mary Nikkel rated the album four stars, stating that "Although this album doesn't bring a lot of innovation or fresh insight to the airwaves, it's a solid and uplifting offering that could easily become a staple in the listener's worship library."

Christian Music Reviews' Daniel Edgeman rated the album four and one fifths out of five, indicating that he can tell the band put in some hard work on the release, and it "is probably one of the best and most mature work the band has put out." At Louder Than the Music, Jono Davies rated the album four stars, saying that the album comes "With some stunning worshipful music", which is chock "full of great lyrics about God [that's] all about turning the listener's attention to the Glory of God, and it does it so well." Emily Kjonaas of Christian Music Zine rated the album four and three fourths out of five, highlighting that "Glory is further proof that they are a force to be reckoned with." At The Front Row Report, Reggie Edwards rated the album nine out of ten, stating that the album gets really close to being the band's best release.

Julia Kitzing of CM Addict rated the album four-and-a-half stars, affirming that "each one has hard hitting lyrics that will make you stop and reflect on what Jesus has done for us", and felt that "It's an album full of original worship songs that point you to the cross." At Jesus Freak Hideout, Alex "Tincan" Caldwell rated the album two-and-a-half stars, indicating that "while containing some nice moments, [the album] feels like an assignment that was not given the student's undivided attention and does not demonstrate their full potential." Jerold Wallace rated the album a one star, writing that "Glory isn't a bad album, but simply ordinary." Founder John DiBiase rated the album two stars, saying that the release "brings nothing new at all to the table."

Commercial performance
For the Billboard charting week of March 1, 2014, Glory was the No.105 most sold album in the entirety of the United States via the Billboard 200 and it was the No. 5 most sold album in the Christian category by the Christian Albums charting. Also, the album was the No. 24 most sold album on the Top Rock Albums chart, and on the Top Alternative Albums chart it was the No. 17 most sold. The album was the No. 18 most sold on the Independent Albums chart.

Track listing

Personnel 
Kutless
 Jon Micah Sumrall – lead and backing vocals 
 James Mead – lead guitars 
 Nick De Partee – rhythm guitars 
 Kyle Peek – drums, percussion 

Additional Musicians
Tracks #1, 2, 3 & 5-12
 Dave Lubben – keyboards, programming, bass, guitars, percussion, backing vocals 

Track #4
 Tim Lauer – keyboards
 Anthony Porcheddu – keyboards
 Mike Payne – additional guitar 
 Tony Lucido – bass 
 Shannon Forrest – drums 
 John Catchings – cello 
 Monisa Angell – viola
 David Angell – violin
 David Davidson – violin 
 Luke Brown – backing vocals

Production 
Tracks #1, 2, 3 & 5-12
 Dave Lubben – producer 
 F. Reid Shippen – mixing 
 Ted Jensen – mastering 

Track #4
 Ian Eskelin – producer 
 Aaron Shannon – recording 
 Anthony Porcheddu – recording 
 Baheo "Bobby" Shin – string recording
 Marc Laquesta – vocal recording, vocal editing 
 Barry Weeks – vocal recording, vocal editing 
 Ainslie Grosser – mixing 
 Troy Glessner – mastering 

Additional Credits
 Nick De Partee – artwork, design 
 Meghann Street Buswell – photography

Chart performance

References

2014 albums
BEC Recordings albums